Julien Dive (born 21 May 1985) is a French politician serving as the member of the National Assembly for the second constituency of Aisne since 2016. A member of The Republicans, he was elected to the municipal council of Itancourt in 2008 and became Mayor of Itancourt in 2014.

Biography

Early life
After studying at the college "Suzanne Deustch" of Moÿ-de-l'Aisne, then "Josquin-Dès-Près" of Beaurevoir, he entered the school "Saint-Jean" in Saint-Quentin. After obtaining the baccalaureate, he entered the Prytanée National Militaire of La Flèche in 2003 to prepare the competition of ESM Saint-Cyr to become an officer in the army. Finally, he obtained a degree in economics at the University of Valenciennes and Hainaut-Cambresis and a master's degree in entrepreneurship and management of SMEs at the IAE Valenciennes in 2008.

At the same time, following the economic dismissal of his commercial father, he created with him a SARL in 2013 specialized in the sale of tools and maintenance of agricultural equipment for farmers in Aisne. Born into a family of itinerant traders in the Saint-Quentin market in fruit and vegetables and whose grandfather had worked for 50 years, Julien Dive was always attached to the defense of local businesses.

Political career
His entry into politics began in 2003, when at the age of 18 he joined the UMP and began as an activist in the youth section, which he became the departmental head in 2009. Only elected from the opposition list in the 2008 French municipal elections in his family village of Itancourt, he became mayor in 2014 French municipal elections.
Touched by the limitation of the plurality of the mandates, he resigns from her position of Mayor of Itancourt on 17 July 2017.

In 2015 French departmental elections, Dive was in pairs with Orane Gobert to become county councilor of the Canton of Ribemont. He came third in the first round of the election with 25.59% and decided to stay in the second round in a triangular against the binomial FN, who came first in the first round, and the pair PS. He finished third with 22.82%.

Member of the National Assembly
Following the 2015 French regional elections, the deputy for the  2nd constituency of Aisne, Xavier Bertrand resigned, to devote himself to the presidency of the Hauts-de-France. Julien Dive becomes the candidate of The Republicans for the by-election on 13 and 20 March 2016. On 20 March, he wins the election in the second round against the candidate FN, Sylvie Saillard-Meunier.

On 18 June 2017, he was re-elected against the candidate FN Sylvie Saillard-Meunier.
During a 15th legislature of the French Fifth Republic, he sits on the Economic Affairs Committee. He is Vice-president of the France-Netherlands Friendship Group and Vice-president oh  the France-Kosovo Friendship Group.

See also
 2017 French legislative election

References

1985 births
Living people
Deputies of the 14th National Assembly of the French Fifth Republic
Deputies of the 15th National Assembly of the French Fifth Republic
The Republicans (France) politicians
People from Saint-Quentin, Aisne
Politicians from Hauts-de-France
Deputies of the 16th National Assembly of the French Fifth Republic